Galust is an Armenian given name. Notable people with the name include:

 Galust Aloyan, Armenian fedayi and one of the Armenian national liberation movement figures
 Galust Petrosyan, Armenian football forward
 Galust Sahakyan, Armenian politician, MP and the former President of the National Assembly of Armenia
 Galust Trapizonyan, Abkhazian politician and former military commander

Armenian given names